The Olympic-class ocean liners were a trio of British ocean liners built by the Harland & Wolff shipyard for the White Star Line during the early 20th century. All three were designed to be the largest and most luxurious passenger ships at that time, designed to give White Star an advantage in the transatlantic passenger trade.

While Olympic, the lead vessel, had a career spanning 24 years and was retired and sold for scrap in 1935, her sisters would not see similar success: Titanic struck an iceberg and sank on her maiden voyage and Britannic was lost during World War I after hitting a mine off Kea in the Aegean Sea before she could enter passenger service.

Although two of the vessels did not have successful careers, they are among the most famous ocean liners ever built. Both Olympic and Titanic enjoyed the distinction of being the largest ships in the world. Titanics story has been adapted into many books, films, and television programs and Britannic inspired a film of the same name in 2000.

 Origin and construction 

The Olympic class had its origins in the intense competition between the United Kingdom and Germany in the construction of the liners. The Norddeutscher Lloyd and Hamburg America Line, the two largest German companies, were indeed involved in the race for speed and size in the late 19th century.

Then followed the three sister ships to Kaiser Wilhelm der Grosse: ,  and  all of whom were part of a "". Mauretania held the Blue Riband for more than twenty years, from 1909 to 1929.

The White Star Line knew that their Big Four, a quartet of ships built for size and luxury, were no match for the Cunard's new liners in terms of speed. In 1907, J. Bruce Ismay, president of the White Star and William J. Pirrie, director of the Harland & Wolff shipyards decided to build three vessels. The Olympic-class ships were built to surpass rival Cunard's Lusitania and Mauretania in size and luxury. Olympic, along with Titanic and the soon to be built Britannic–, were intended to be the largest and most luxurious ships to operate on the North Atlantic, but not the fastest, as the White Star Line had already switched from high speed to size and luxury. The three vessels were designed by Thomas Andrews and Alexander Carlisle.

Construction of Olympic started in December 1908 and Titanic in March 1909. The two ships were built side by side. The construction of Britannic began in 1911 after the commissioning of Olympic and Titanic launch. Following the sinking of Titanic, the two remaining vessels underwent many changes in their safety provisions.

 Specifications 

All three of the Olympic-class ships had nine decks, seven of which were for passenger use. From top to bottom, the decks were:

 Boat Deck. The topmost deck of the ship, where the deck housing, lifeboats, and funnels were installed. The bridge and wheelhouse were at the forward end, in front of the captain's and officers' quarters. The bridge was flanked by two observations platforms on the Starboard and Port sides so that the ship could be manoeuvred more delicately while docking. The wheelhouse stood within the Bridge. The entrance to the First Class Grand Staircase and Gymnasium were located midships along with the raised roof of the First Class Lounge, while at the rear of the deck were the roof of the First Class smoke room, a deck house for the ship's engineers, and a relatively modest Second Class entrance. The wood-covered deck was divided into four segregated promenades: for officers, First Class passengers, engineers, and Second Class passengers respectively. Lifeboats lined the side of the deck on both sides except in the First Class area, where there was a gap so that the view would not be blocked.

 A Deck, also called the Promenade Deck, ran the entire  length of the superstructure. It was for First Class passengers only and contained First Class cabins all the way forward, the First Class lounge, Smoke Room, Reading and Writing Room and Palm Court. The promenade on Olympic was unenclosed along its whole length, whereas on Titanic and Britannic, the forward half was enclosed by a steel screen with sliding windows.
 B Deck, also known as the Bridge Deck, was almost entirely devoted to First-Class staterooms. All three ships had À la Carte Restaurants positioned aft on B-Deck, as well as the Second-Class Smoking Rooms and Entrances. Olympic was built with an encircling First-Class promenade which soon proved to be redundant given the ample promenade space on A-Deck. Titanic added enlarged additional staterooms to occupy the space and a Café Parisien built as an annex to an enlarged Restaurant. This arrangement proved so popular that Olympic would adopt the same additions during its 1913 refit. On the exterior of each ship, B-Deck is defined by rectangular sliding windows.
 C Deck, the Shelter Deck, was the uppermost deck to run uninterrupted from the ships' bow to stern. It included the two well decks, both of which served as the Third Class promenade spaces. Each well deck also contained large cranes for loading cargo into the interior holds. Crew cabins were located under the forecastle and Third Class public rooms were situated under the Poop Deck. The superstructure of C Deck between the bow and stern contained mostly First Class accommodation, but the Second Class Library was also placed further aft, directly below the Second Class Smoking Room. 

 D Deck, the Saloon Deck, was dominated by three large public rooms – the First Class Reception Room, the First Class Dining Saloon and the Second Class Dining Saloon. An open space was provided for Third Class passengers underneath in the bow. Second Class and Third Class passengers had cabins on this deck, with berths for firemen located in the bow. It was originally the highest deck reached by the ships' watertight bulkheads (though only by eight of the fifteen bulkheads). This was later changed in the Olympic in a 1913 refit following the loss of Titanic. Britannic was designed with bulkheads extending to the main deck.
 E Deck, the Upper Deck, was predominantly a passenger accommodation for all three classes as well as berths for cooks, seamen, stewards and trimmers. There was also Third-Class cabins with a long passageway nicknamed Scotland Road by the crew, in reference to a famous street in Liverpool.
 F Deck, the Middle Deck, was the last complete deck and predominantly accommodated Third Class passengers. There were also some Second and Third Class cabins and crew accommodation. The Third Class dining saloon was located here, as were the swimming pool and Turkish baths, the only section for First-Class passengers.
 G Deck, the Lower Deck, was the lowest complete deck to accommodate passengers, and had the lowest portholes, protruding above the waterline. The squash court was located here along with the travelling post office where mail clerks sorted letters and parcels so that they would be ready for delivery when the ship docked. Food was also stored here. The deck was interrupted at several points by orlop (partial) decks over the boiler, engine and turbine rooms.
 The Orlop decks and the Tank Top were at the lowest level of the ship, below the waterline. The orlop decks were used as cargo space, while the Tank Top – the inner bottom of the ship's hull – provided the platform on which the ship's boilers, engines, turbines and electrical generators were housed. This part of the ship was dominated by the engine and boiler rooms, areas which were generally never seen by passengers. They were connected with higher levels of the ship by flights of stairs; twin spiral stairways near the bow gave access up to D Deck.
Propulsion was achieved through three propellers: two outboard or wing propellers had three blades, while the central propeller had four. The two lateral propellers were powered by reciprocating steam triple expansion, while the central shaft was driven by a steam turbine. All power on board was derived from a total of 29 coal-fired steam boilers in six compartments. However, Olympics boilers were adapted for firing by oil at the end of the First World War, which reduced the number of engine crew required from 350 to 60.

Olympic became the largest ship in the world when it was completed in May, 1911 before losing the title to its sister Titanic when she was completed in April, 1912. After the loss of Titanic, the third sister ship Britannic claimed the title of largest British-built ship, until her own sinking in November 1916.

All three vessels had four funnels, with the fourth being a dummy which was used for ventilation and aesthetic purposes. Smoke from the galleys and Smoking Room fireplaces and fumes from the engine rooms was exhausted through a chimney up the forward portion of this funnel.  While it was a decoration to establish a symmetry in the ships' profile, it acted as a huge ventilation shaft, replacing a large amount of ventilation cowls on deck, as on Cunard's Lusitania and Mauretania.

Safety features

The trio of ships incorporated advanced safety precautions into their designs, intended to mitigate the risk of flooding and all but eliminate the chances of foundering. The compartments could be sealed by automatic doors from the bridge in the event of a collision, preventing water from spreading to other parts of the ship. Olympic and Titanic were so designed that either could stay afloat with four compartments breached. The Olympic-class liners also eliminated longitudinal bulkheads, such as those on Lusitania and Mauretania, which separated the coal bunkers along either side of the hull from the engine rooms and boiler rooms in the center. Such an arrangement was believed to increase the risk of a ship capsizing by trapping water lengthwise along the ship and increasing her list to one side.

The sinking of Titanic revealed serious faults in the design of the Olympic-class liners, needing a major refit for Olympic in late 1912 and major design changes to Britannic, which was still in the early phases of construction. Titanic had sunk because her five forward compartments had been breached, above the keel but below the waterline, bypassing the double-bottom completely. The low height of the bulkheads had also failed the ship, allowing for uncontrolled flooding once the water in the breached compartments had reached E Deck. The refit on Olympic raised the middle five bulkheads to B Deck, the others to D Deck and also extended the double-bottom along the hull up to G Deck. These improvements were incorporated into Britannic, along with two additional bulkheads. Such improvements meant that both Olympic and Britannic could survive the scenario that had caused their sister ship to founder. The three ships were fitted with brass three-chime triple-chambered steam whistles on all four funnels. Only the whistles on the first and second funnels functioned however, as those on the third and fourth funnels were dummies fitted for aesthetic reasons and had no valves or bellows.

Lifeboats

Each ship could accommodate a maximum of 64 lifeboats. However, only 20 boats were installed on Olympic and Titanic during construction to avoid cluttering the deck and provide more space for passengers. Shipbuilders of the era envisaged the ocean liner itself as the ultimate lifeboat and therefore imagined that a lifeboat's purpose was that of a ferry between a foundering liner and a rescue ship. Despite the low number of lifeboats, both Olympic and Titanic exceeded Board of Trade regulations of the time. Following the sinking of Titanic, more lifeboats were added to Olympic (some lifeboats might even have been from the foundered Titanic). Britannic, meanwhile, was equipped with eight huge gantry davits, six along the Boat Deck and two on the Poop Deck at the stern. Each contained six lifeboats and were individually powered by electric motors with their own night time illumination. In the event that the ship should develop a list and make the lowering of lifeboats impossible along one side, the davits could be manoeuvred to pick up lifeboats from the other side of the deck.

 Interiors 

The three vessels had a total of 8 levels of passenger accommodation, with slight variations between the ships. However, no class was neglected. The first class passengers enjoyed luxurious cabins, many of which were equipped with private bathrooms, a novelty at the time. The two most luxurious suites included a private promenade deck, sitting room, two walk-in wardrobes, two bedrooms, a private bath, and lavatory. Each class had its own large dining saloon, while first class also featured a lavish Grand Staircase descending in seven levels through the ship,(a second smaller grand staircase which only transcended down three decks.) a Georgian-style smoking room, a Veranda Cafe decorated with palm trees, a swimming pool, Turkish bath, gymnasium, and several other places for meals and entertainment. The Olympic-class liners were the first British ships to contain separate restaurants independent of the dining saloons. These were in imitation of the precedent set on the German Hamburg-America liner  (1905), which had included a restaurant serving French haute cuisine run by the famous hotelier César Ritz. Olympic and Titanic had À la Carte restaurant aft on B-Deck run by the London restaurateur Luigi Gatti and his staff, all of whom died in the sinking of Titanic.

The second class also included a smoking room, a library, a spacious dining room, and an elevator. Britannics second class also featured a gymnasium.

Finally, the third-class passengers enjoyed reasonable accommodation compared to other ships, if not up to the second and first classes. Instead of large dormitories offered by most ships of the time, the third-class passengers of the Olympic class lived in cabins containing two to ten bunks. The class also had a smoking room, a common area, and a dining room. Britannic provided third-class passengers more comfort than its two sister ships.

Careers

1:  For ships in passenger service, "commissioned" is taken to mean the date of departure on maiden passenger voyage

 Olympic 

First of the Olympic-class liners, Olympic was launched on 20 October 1910 and commissioned on 14 June 1911. She made her maiden voyage on 14 June 1911, under the command of Captain Edward J. Smith, to great fanfare and acclaim. On 20 September of the same year, while under the command of a harbour pilot she was involved in a collision with the cruiser  in the port of Southampton, leading to her repair back at Harland and Wolff and delaying the completion of Titanic. When her sister sank, Olympic was on her way across the Atlantic, in the opposite direction. She was able to receive a distress call from Titanic but she was too far away to reach her before she sank. After the sinking of Titanic, Olympic was returned to dry dock in October 1912, where she underwent a number of refinements to improve her safety. She then resumed her commercial service.

During the First World War, the ship served as a troop transport. On 12 May 1918, she rammed and sank the German submarine . Once she was returned to commercial service in 1920, she crossed the Atlantic as one of a trio of grand White Star liners. The other two were seized as war reparations from Germany –the HAPAG's unfinished  which was renamed Majestic, and NDL's  which became the Homeric.
During the 1920s Olympic would enjoy great popularity on the transatlantic route, earning the nickname The Ship Magnificent'. She often carried famous celebrities of the day, included the actor Charlie Chaplin and the then Prince of Wales Edward VIII. In 1934 she inadvertently collided with and sank , leading to the death of seven of the lightship's eleven crewmembers.

Despite a major refit later in her career, Olympic struggled to compete with her newer competitors. Following the merger of the White Star Line and Cunard Line in 1934, the ship was taken out of service in April 1935, and scrapped in Jarrow between 1935 and 1937.

Titanic 

Second in line of the Olympic class, Titanic was launched on 31 May 1911, and her commissioning was slightly delayed due to ongoing repairs of Olympic. After a stopover at Cherbourg, France and another in Queenstown, Ireland, she sailed into the Atlantic with 2,200 passengers and crew on board, under the command of Captain Edward J. Smith headed for New York City. The crossing took place without major incident until Sunday, 14 April at 23:40.

Titanic struck an iceberg at   while sailing about 400 miles south of the Grand Banks of Newfoundland at 11:40 pm ships time. The strike and the resulting shock sheared the rivets, thus opening a leak in the hull below the waterline. This caused the first five compartments to be flooded with flooding in a sixth compartment controlled by the pumps; the ship could only stay afloat with four compartments flooded. Titanic sank 2 hours and 40 minutes after the collision. There were not enough lifeboats for all the passengers and the nearest responding ship being too far away, 1,514 of the 2,224 people on board died, making it one of the deadliest peacetime maritime disasters in history.

Britannic 

The third of the Olympic-class trio, Britannic was ordered in 1911 and launched on 26 February 1914 at the Harland and Wolff shipyard in Belfast and fitting out began. In August 1914, before Britannic could commence transatlantic service between New York and Southampton, World War I began. Immediately, all shipyards with Admiralty contracts were given top priority to use available raw materials. All civil contracts (including Britannic) were slowed down.

On 13 November 1915, Britannic was requisitioned as a hospital ship from her storage location at Belfast. Repainted white and from bow to stern with large red crosses and a horizontal green stripe, she was renamed HMHS (His Majesty's Hospital Ship) Britannic.

Survivors numbered 1,036, and 30 men lost their lives in the disaster. One survivor, nurse Violet Jessop was notable as having also previously survived the sinking of Titanic in 1912, and had also been on board Olympic, at the time when it collided with HMS Hawke in 1911. Britannic was the largest ship lost during World War I, but her sinking did not receive the same attention as the sinking of her sister ship, or the sinking of the Cunard liner , when she was sunk by a torpedo in the Irish Sea.

Legacy

Wrecks and expeditions 
When Titanic sank in 1912 and Britannic sank in 1916, their sinkings did not receive the same attention, due to the death toll (1,517 on Titanic and 30 on Britannic) and the ongoing First World War. Because the exact position of the sinking of the Britannic is known and the location is shallow, the wreck was discovered relatively easily in 1975. Titanic, however, drew everyone's attention in 1912. The discovery of the wreck occurred on 1 September 1985, at 25 kilometres from the position given of the sinking. The wreck lies about 4,000 metres deep, broken in two. The bow is relatively well preserved, but the stern partially imploded, and to a large extent disintegrated during the descent and impact on the seabed.

The wreck of Britannic was discovered in 1975 by Jacques Cousteau. It has a large tear in the front caused by the bow hitting the ocean floor before the rest of the ship sank, as the ship's length is greater than the depth of the water. After the discovery, she has been seen regularly as part of many other expeditions. In contrast to Titanic, which lies at the very bottom of the North Atlantic and is being fed on by iron-eating bacteria, Britannic is in remarkably good condition, and is much more accessible than her infamous sister. Many external structural features are still intact, including the propellers, and a great deal of the superstructure and hull.

Cultural heritage 

Museums and exhibitions pay tribute to the ships, and the two tragedies have inspired many movies, novels and even musicals and video games.

When she was decommissioned in 1935, Olympic –the only surviving ship of her class– was previously set to be converted into a floating hotel, but the project was cancelled. However, its decorative elements were auctioned. The first class lounge and part of the aft grand staircase can be found in the White Swan Hotel, in Alnwick, Northumberland, England.

Tributes and replicas 

Due to the history and the story behind the sinking of the Titanic, several attempts to recreate the ship, partly or totally, were made throughout the years, from floating replicas, inland recreations, to an actual reimagining of the ship.

Notes

References

Citations

Sources

Further reading 

 
 

Ship classes
 
Four funnel liners
Ocean liner classes
Ships with Scotch marine boilers